DGLUCY (D-glutamate cyclase) is a protein that in humans is encoded by the DGLUCY gene.

Orthologs 

The human gene, DGLUCY, is highly conserved in mammals and birds. Orthologs gathered from BLAST and BLAT searches reveal that the human DGLUCY mRNA sequence is conserved with a sequence identity of 98% in chimpanzees, 88% in mice, and 81% in platypus and chicken. The following table contains a list orthologs that were gathered from BLAST searches.  Sequence alignments were performed using blastn to derive sequence identity, score, and E-values between the human c14orf159 variant 1 mRNA and its orthologs.

The protein that the human gene DGLUCY encodes has been found to be highly conserved among mammals, birds, amphibians, fish, tunicates, cnidarians, and echinoderms.  However, no protein orthologs have been found in nematodes, arthropods, fungi, protists, plants, bacteria, or archea.  Fungi and bacteria contain the DUF1445 conserved domain which is found in human c14orf159 and its orthologs.  BLAST and BLAT searches have been utilized to find orthologs to the c14orf159 protein.  The following table lists protein orthologs for the human protein with sequence identity, sequence similarity, scores, and E-values derived from blastp sequence comparisons.

Post-translational modification 

The protein product of the DGLUCY gene is predicted and was found to be translocated to mitochondrion.

Post-translational modifications are predicted for the protein DGLUCY.  All predicted sites in human DGLUCY were compared to orthologs using multiple sequence alignments to determine likelihood of modification.

Regulation 

Estrogen receptor alpha, in the presence of estradiol, binds to the DGLUCY gene and likely regulates its expression.

References

External links

Further reading

Human proteins